was a researcher of Japanese literature and a poet.

Biography
Masamune Atsuo was born in Wake District Honami (present-day Bizen), Okayama Prefecture, he was the younger brother of novelist and literary critic Masamune Hakuchō. While his brother moved to Tokyo to work, Atsuo remained home and ran the family business. He studied waka under the guidance of Inoue Michiyasu, and was friends with Shimaki Akahiko and Saitō Mokichi.  In addition to work, he wrote waka and researched Japanese literature. Due to his achievements, in 1952 he became a professor at Notre Dame Seishin University in Okayama.

This collection is still in existence and contains many valuable texts.

External links
 
 Masamune Hakuchō and Atsuo (in Japanese)

1881 births
1958 deaths
People from Okayama Prefecture
Japanese literature academics
20th-century Japanese poets